Drys may refer to:

Places
Drys (Thrace) (Δρῦς), an ancient city in Thrace
Drys (Δρῦς), one of the names of the ancient city of Rouphinianai in Bithynia
Drys (Δρῦς), an ancient city at Epirus which hasn't been discovered yet

Other
Georgios Drys (Γεώργιος Δρυς), a Greek politician
DRYS, DryShips Inc.